"Boops (Here to Go)" is a song by Jamaican duo Sly and Robbie, released in 1987 as the first single from the album Rhythm Killers. The song is their most successful in the United Kingdom, where it reached No. 12 on the UK Singles Chart in May 1987, and remained on the chart for a total of 11 weeks. The song also reached No. 13 in New Zealand, and No. 58 in the Netherlands.

In 2006, English musician Robbie Williams interpolated "Boops (Here to Go)" in his song "Rudebox", which was a number one hit in several countries.

Track listing
UK 12"
A. "Boops (Here to Go)" - 5:20
B1. "Don't Stop the Music" - 5:45
B2. "Boops (Instrumental)" - 4:04

Charts

References

1987 songs
1987 singles
Sly and Robbie songs
4th & B'way Records singles
Island Records singles
Songs written by Bootsy Collins